Ribosomal RNA processing protein 1 homolog A is a protein that in humans is encoded by the RRP1 gene.

The protein encoded by this gene is the putative homolog of the yeast ribosomal RNA processing protein RRP1. The encoded protein is involved in the late stages of nucleologenesis at the end of mitosis, and may be required for the generation of 28S rRNA.

References

Further reading